Gangaram Chak is a village, in the Debra CD block in the Kharagpur subdivision of the Paschim Medinipur district in the state of West Bengal, India.

Geography

Location

Area overview
Kharagpur subdivision, shown partly in the map alongside, mostly has alluvial soils, except in two CD blocks in the west – Kharagpur I and Keshiary, which mostly have lateritic soils. Around 74% of the total cultivated area is cropped more than once. With a density of population of 787 per km2nearly half of the district’s population resides in this subdivision. 14.33% of the population lives in urban areas and 86.67% lives in the rural areas.

Note: The map alongside presents some of the notable locations in the subdivision. All places marked in the map are linked in the larger full screen map.

Demographics
As per 2011 Census of India Gangaram Chak had a total population of 304 of which 147 (48%) were males and 157 (52%) were females. Population below 6 years was 28. The total number of literates in Gangaram Chak was 219 (72.04% of the population over 6 years).

.* For language details see Debra (community development block)#Language and religion

Transport
Gangaram Chak is on the Debra-Tabagaria Road. This road connects it to the Dankuni-Chennai NH 16 near Haipat on one side and  Balichak railway station on the Howrah-Kharagpur line of South Eastern Railway on the other side.

Education
Debra Thana Sahid Kshudiram Smriti Mahavidyalaya, established in 2006, is affiliated to the Vidyasagar University. It offers honours courses in Bengali, English, Sanskrit, history, philosophy, geography, education, mathematics and physics. It also offers a course in BCA.

References
	

Villages in Paschim Medinipur district